Laurelville is a village in Hocking County, Ohio, United States. The population was 527 at the 2010 census.

The Hocking State Forest is located outside Laurelville.

History
Laurelville was laid out in 1871 by John and W. S. Albin, and Solomon Riegel. The village was named for the laurel growing near the original town site.

Geography
Laurelville is located at  (39.471135, -82.738186).

Demographics

2010 census
As of the census of 2010, there were 527 people, 252 households, and 120 families living in the village. The racial makeup of the village was 97.3% White, 0.4% Native American, 0.6% Asian, 0.8% from other races, and 0.9% from two or more races. Hispanic or Latino of any race were 0.4% of the population.

There were 252 households, of which 26.2% had children under the age of 18 living with them, 31.7% were married couples living together, 13.1% had a female householder with no husband present, 2.8% had a male householder with no wife present, and 52.4% were non-families. 47.6% of all households were made up of individuals, and 24.3% had someone living alone who was 65 years of age or older. The average household size was 2.09 and the average family size was 3.04.

The median age in the village was 39.5 years. 25% of residents were under the age of 18; 9% were between the ages of 18 and 24; 22.7% were from 25 to 44; 22.3% were from 45 to 64; and 20.9% were 65 years of age or older. The gender makeup of the village was 44.6% male and 55.4% female.

2000 census
As of the census of 2000, there were 533 people, 256 households, and 136 families living in the village. The population density was 2,605.0 people per square mile (1,029.0/km). There were 277 housing units at an average density of 1,353.8 per square mile (534.8/km). The racial makeup of the village was 98.69% White, 0.19% Native American, 0.38% from other races, and 0.75% from two or more races. Hispanic or Latino of any race were 0.56% of the population.

There were 256 households, out of which 25.4% had children under the age of 18 living with them, 39.8% were married couples living together, 8.6% had a female householder with no husband present, and 46.5% were non-families. 43.0% of all households were made up of individuals, and 22.7% had someone living alone who was 65 years of age or older. The average household size was 2.08 and the average family size was 2.86.

In the village, the population was spread out, with 21.4% under the age of 18, 7.5% from 18 to 24, 27.0% from 25 to 44, 22.1% from 45 to 64, and 22.0% who were 65 years of age or older. The median age was 40 years. For every 100 females, there were 91.0 males. For every 100 females age 18 and over, there were 83.8 males.

The median income for a household in the village was $24,250, and the median income for a family was $41,250. Males had a median income of $30,227 versus $18,000 for females. The per capita income for the village was $15,339. About 6.6% of families and 13.5% of the population were below the poverty line, including 8.3% of those under age 18 and 27.2% of those age 65 or over.

Education
Logan Elm Local School District operates an elementary school in the village.

Laurelville has a public library, a branch of the Logan-Hocking Public Library.

References

Villages in Ohio
Villages in Hocking County, Ohio